Jordi Roca i Fontané (born 1978, Girona, Catalonia, Spain) is the pastry chef of the restaurant El Celler de Can Roca. In 2014 he won the inaugural "World's Best Pastry Chef" award from Restaurant magazine. In April 2018, an episode of Chef's Table: Pastry featuring Jordi debuted on Netflix. He suffers from dysphonia, a neurological disease that has left him permanently hoarse.

Acknowledgments 
 2002. Second Michelin Star for El Celler de Can Roca.
 2009. Third Michelin Star for El Celler de Can Roca. and 5th position in the Restaurant Magazine;
 2011. Second best restaurant in the world for El Celler de Can Roca, by the Restaurant Magazine;
 2012. Second best restaurant in the world for El Celler de Can Roca, by the Restaurant Magazine;
 2013. Best restaurant in the world for El Celler de Can Roca, by the Restaurant Magazine;
 2014. Second best restaurant in the world for El Celler de Can Roca, by the Restaurant Magazine.
 2015. Best restaurant in the world for El Celler de Can Roca, by the Restaurant Magazine;

Publications
El Celler de Can Roca, by Joan, Josep and Jordi Roca. In Catalan, Spanish and English.

References

External links 
 Jordi Roca Biography

1978 births
Living people
People from Girona
Pastry chefs
Spanish chefs
Chefs from Catalonia